Ann Cotton (fl. 1650s–1670s) was the author of a personal account of Bacon's Rebellion. Her birth and death dates are unknown. She was married to John Cotton. The couple owned a plantation in Queen's Creek, Virginia. Her account of Bacon's Rebellion is in the form of a letter written in 1676 and published in its original form in 1804 in the Richmond Enquirer under the title An account of our late troubles in Virginia.

In 2018 the Virginia Capitol Foundation announced that Cotton's name would be on the Virginia Women's Monument's glass Wall of Honor.

References

Further reading
 John and Ann Cotton, of "Queen's Creek," Virginia by Jay B. Hubbell American Literature Vol. 10, No. 2 (May, 1938), Duke University Press

17th-century American women
People from Virginia
Date of birth missing
Date of death missing